The Oyo River is a river in southern Central Java and Yogyakarta, in the central south area of Java island, Indonesia. It is a tributary of the Opak River.

It was the river on which the historical palaces of Mataram were located - Sultan Agung's Karta palace, and his son's Plered palace.

Geography
The river flows in the southwest area of Java with predominantly tropical monsoon climate (designated as Am in the Köppen-Geiger climate classification). The annual average temperature in the area is 23 °C. The warmest month is October, when the average temperature is around 24 °C, and the coldest is January, at 22 °C. The average annual rainfall is 2970 mm. The wettest month is January, with an average of 537 mm rainfall, and the driest is September, with 22 mm rainfall.

See also
List of rivers of Java
List of rivers of Indonesia

References

External links 
 Upstream coordinates: 

About Oyo River

Rivers of Yogyakarta
Sleman Regency
Landforms of the Special Region of Yogyakarta
Rivers of Indonesia